Martín de Calatayud (1501 – November 9, 1548) was a Roman Catholic prelate who served as Bishop of Santa Marta (1543–1548).

Biography
Martín de Calatayud was born in Calatayud, Spain and ordained a priest in the Orden de San Jerónimo. On December 19, 1543, Pope Paul III appointed him Bishop of Santa Marta.
In December 1547, he was consecrated bishop by Jerónimo de Loayza, Archbishop of Lima with García Díaz Arias, Bishop of Quito, and Juan Solano, Bishop of Cuzco, as co-consecrators. 
He died on November 9, 1548.

See also
Catholic Church in Colombia

References

External links and additional sources
 (for Chronology of Bishops) 
 (for Chronology of Bishops) 

1501 births
1548 deaths
Bishops appointed by Pope Paul III
16th-century Roman Catholic bishops in New Granada
Roman Catholic bishops of Santa Marta